The Kfz. 13 (also Maschinengewehr-Kraftwagen) was the first armoured reconnaissance vehicle introduced by the Reichswehr after the First World War and, by 1935, 147 units of this lightly armoured vehicle had been delivered to the fleet. The Kfz. 13 was based on a civilian car, the Adler Standard 6. Although the Kfz. 13 was equipped with all-wheel drive, the vehicle had poor cross-country capability.
The unarmed version, the Kfz. 14 communications vehicle, was equipped with a radio set instead of the machine gun.

The Kfz. 13 was deployed in the Invasion of Poland and the Battle of France. It was retired from active service in 1941 and only used thereafter for training purposes.

See also 
 List of German military equipment of World War II
 D-8 Armored Car - Contemporary Soviet design based on Ford Model A.

References
 Maschinengewehrkraftwagen Kfz.13 at www.achtungpanzer.com.

External links

Reichswehr
Armoured cars of the interwar period
Reconnaissance vehicles of World War II
World War II armoured fighting vehicles of Germany
Military vehicles introduced in the 1930s